Rosanne Santos Mulholland (born 31 December 1980) is a Brazilian actress and writer. She played the lead role, teacher Helena, in the Brazilian version of the telenovela Carrusel.

Biography 
Rosanne Mulholland was born in Brasilia, capital of Brazil, the eldest daughter of the American psychologist Timothy Mulholland, former dean of the University of Brasilia and Lurdisceia Santos. She lived with her Baptist Church missionary grandparents until she was 13 years old.

Career 
She started her career as a theater actress when she was 12 years old and later she starred several college and shopping mall television advertisements, because of that Brasília locals gave her the nickname ad girl. At the same time period she met fellow Brasília José Eduardo Belmonte, who later hired her when she moved to Rio de Janeiro.

Her cinema debut was the 2002 short film Dez Dias Felizes, written by Belmonte, followed by Araguaya - Conspiração do Silêncio, a film recorded while she was studying Psychology at the Centro Universitário de Brasília (UniCEUB). She participated in the A Concepção film, by Belmonte, Rio de Janeiro, then returned to Brasília, living two months in her home city. In 2004, she moved to Leblon neighborhood, in Rio de Janeiro, to earn a Psychology major at Gestalt and to work as an actress. She failed to receive a Psychology degree, starred a few television advertisements and participated in two plays, Amor com Amor se Paga and A Glória de Nelson. She graduated at Rede Globo's Actor's Workshop, and took theater classes with Daniel Herz at Casa de Cultura Laura Alvin until she was chosen to star in the A Concepção film. The film poster was on the cover of the May 2006 edition of the Revista de Cinema magazine.

Regarding the film Falsa Loura, she said to G1 web portal: “I have never imagined playing a proletarian, it is nothing like me. It was a big challenge”. Her portrayal of the character affected Reichenbach so much that he changed the film ending, giving a happy ending for Mulholland's character, explaining that “she brought so much dignity to her character that I had to change everything, she give a new meaning for the character and consequently the story”. She was praised for her work in this film.

She guest starred in the 2007 telenovela Sete Pecados. The actress then moved to São Paulo in April 2008 to work in the Rede Bandeirantes telenovela Água na Boca.

Rosanne Mulholland was cast in 2011 to star as school teacher Helena in SBT's telenovela Carrossel. She said in an interview that she was scared to play a school teacher. She played the character René in the 2012 film Menos que Nada.

Rosanne Mulholland won the Prêmio Jovem Brasileiro for best actress in October 2012, for her role in the telenovela Carrossel. She played Débora in the 2014-2015 Rede Globo telenovela Alto Astral.

Filmography

Television

Cinema

Stage

References

External links 
 

1980 births
Living people
Actresses from Brasília
Brazilian people of American descent
Brazilian television actresses
Brazilian film actresses
Brazilian stage actresses
21st-century Brazilian actresses